Lichenopeltella stereocaulorum is a species of lichenicolous fungus belonging to the class Dothideomycetes. It was described in 2010 from an infected specimen of Stereocaulon botryosum.

It has a similar appearance to Lichenopeltella cladoniarum but L. stereocaulorum has smaller spores and infects Stereocaulon species, while L. cladoniarum typically infects species of the Cladoniaceae and Physciaceae families.

Distribution and habitat
Lichenipeltella stereocaulorum has a Holarctic distribution in the tundra biome, although it has also been reported from Arctic desert and taiga. It is known from Russia and Canada.

Pathogenicity and host species
Lichenopeltella stereocaulorum infects the stems of Stereocaulon lichens, most commonly at the base of the stem. The following species are known hosts to Lichenopeltella sterecaulorum:

 Stereocaulon alpinum
 Stereocaulon botryosum
 Stereocaulon depressum
 Stereocaulon groenlandicum
 Stereocaulon paschale
 Stereocaulon rivulorum 

It causes no known symptoms of infection in the host.

References

Dothideomycetes
Fungi described in 2010
Fungi of Canada
Fungi of Asia
Lichenicolous fungi
Taxa named by Mikhail Petrovich Zhurbenko